Bash Kand (also Romanized as Bāsh Kand) is a village in Sain Rural District, in the Central District of Sarab County, East Azerbaijan Province, Iran. At the 2006 census, its population was 136, in 26 families.

References 

Populated places in Sarab County